Echinix is a genus of air-breathing land semi-slugs. Echinix is the only genus in the subfamily Echinichinae, terrestrial pulmonate gastropod mollusks in the superfamily Xanthonychoidea. This genus and family was described in December 2012.

Distribution
The subfamily Echinichinae is endemic to states Tamaulipas and Querétaro in northeastern Mexico.

Species 
Species in the genus Echinix include:

 Echinix ochracea Thompson & Naranjo-García, 2012
 Echinix granulata Thompson & Naranjo-García, 2012
 Echinix rugosa Thompson & Naranjo-García, 2012

Description 
Species in the genus Echinix are semi-slugs, which have their shells completely hidden under the mantle. There are numerous glandular papillae on the dorsal part of the body. Dart sac is a part of its reproductive system.

References

External links 
 photo of Echinix ochracea on the cover of Archiv für Molluskenkunde

Xanthonychidae